Virginia Creepers: The Horror Host Tradition of the Old Dominion (or simply Virginia Creepers) is a 2009 documentary film about horror hosts from Virginia directed by Sean Kotz and Christopher Valluzzo.

Kotz and Valluzzo would later release a documentary focusing on horror host Bill Bowman, Hi There Horror Movie Fans: The Bowman Body Documentary, in 2011.

Synopsis 
The documentary focuses on horror show hosts from Virginia and Washington D.C.. Hosts featured in the documentary include the Bowman Body, Mr. Lobo, Count Gore De Vol, Doctor Madblood, and Dr. Gruesome & Skeeter.

Kotz has stated that the documentary gave them the ability to " not only show the progression of hosts but the progression of television history."

Cast 
Mr. Lobo as himself/narrator
Bill Bowman as himself/Bowman Body
Dick Dyszel as himself/Count Gore De Vol
Jerry Harrell as himself/Doctor Madblood
Mark Bartholomew & Matt Pak as Themselves/Dr. Gruesome & Skeeter
John Dimes as himself/Dr. Sarcofiguy
Geri Chronowit as herself/Ghoulda
Hazel Witch as herself
Jebediah Buzzard as himself
Jerry Moore as Karlos Borloff
Jerry Sandford as Ronald

Reception 
Paul Carupe of Rue Morgue reviewed Virginia Creepers saying "The doc ably captures the ramshackle charm of these local productions, the dedicated people that made them and how they became neighborhood stars in the process."

Home media 
On October 30, 2009, Horse Archer Productions released the film on DVD. The DVD cover is a visual reference to the 1945 film House of Dracula.

Bowman Body 
Kotz and Valluzo began work on a documentary focusing on the horror host Bowman Body, Bill Bowman, after the release of Virginia Creepers. They stated that they were approached several times by fans who wanted to "see more of Bowman and they especially wanted more clips from his shows." Researching for the documentary was a challenge as Bowman's show, Shock Theatre, aired before the advent of taping on VCR. Little footage existed as "the station didn’t want to tie up expensive tape with clips from Shock Theatre.” Only thirteen minutes existed of the original footage.

Kotz researched air times for Shock Theatre via copies of the Richmond Times Dispatch in order to compile a filmography of the show during its time on WXEX. He also researched Bowman's shows in other areas of Virginia, Cobweb Theatre (Charlottesville, WVIR) and Monsterpiece Theater (Fairfax, WNVC), noting that WNVC likely only showed public domain films as it was a public broadcasting station. At the height of its popularity Shock Theatre surpassed The Tonight Show in ratings for Central Virginia.

Hi There Horror Movie Fans: The Bowman Body Documentary was released in 2011 and premiered at the Byrd Theatre in Richmond, Virginia. It has been credited by its director, Eric Miller, as assisting in the creation of the PBS show Midnight Frights. Miller, and the show's host Armistead Spottswoode, were both featured in Hi There Horror Movie Fans and its predecessor Virginia Creepers. The pair were recognized by the Richmond PBS programming director due to their appearances and were offered a chance to create a new series.

In 2015 Bowman began hosting new episodes, which were filmed at the Ashland Theater. Films featured in the episodes included House on Haunted Hill.

Further reading

See also 
American Scary

References

External links 
 
 
Official site. Archived at the Wayback Mahine here.
 Hi There Horror Movie Fans official site
 Moria review

2009 films
Documentary films about television
American independent films
American documentary films
2009 documentary films
Documentary films about horror
2000s English-language films
2000s American films
2009 independent films